A painted ceiling is a ceiling covered with an artistic mural or painting.  They are usually decorated with fresco painting, mosaic tiles and other surface treatments. While hard to execute (at least in situ) a decorated ceiling has the advantage that it is largely protected from damage by fingers and dust. In the past, however, this was more than compensated for by the damage from smoke from candles or a fireplace. Many historic buildings have celebrated ceilings, perhaps the most famous in the world is the Sistine Chapel ceiling by Michelangelo.

See also

 Dropped ceiling
 Coffered ceiling
 Camp ceiling
 Cove ceiling
 Beam ceiling
 Scottish Renaissance painted ceilings